The Church of the Transfiguration of the Lord in Trpinja is a Serbian Orthodox church in eastern Croatia. The first church on this site dates from 1753. The first Orthodox Serbs moved into Trpinja  in 1527. From 1573 the Serbian Orthodox community has been the majority population.  The church is listed in Register of Cultural Goods of Croatia and last renovation was completed in 2011.

History
The older church at the site of the present day building was mentioned for the first time in 1695. The description of the church from 1733 mentioned that the lower part of the wall was built of stone, while the rest of it was made of wood, covered with mud covered with oak shingles. The building was consecrated by Nikanor Melentijević. The modern day building was completed in the mid XVIII century and it was consecrated by Sofronije Jovanović. Thirteen years after the new building was completed, there was six Eastern Orthodox priests at the church parish in Trpinja. Parish center was built in 1908. During World War II in Yugoslavia and the Genocide of Serbs in the Independent State of Croatia, the church was converted into a Roman Catholic church while the Đakovo-Osijek priest Stjepan Rade administered forced conversions.

See also
Eparchy of Osječko polje and Baranja
Trpinja
Serbs of Croatia
List of Serbian Orthodox churches in Croatia

References

Churches completed in 1753
18th-century Serbian Orthodox church buildings
Trpinja
Register of Cultural Goods of the Republic of Croatia